Łukawica may refer to the following places:
Łukawica, Lublin Voivodeship (east Poland)
Łukawica, Podlaskie Voivodeship (north-east Poland)
Łukawica, Lesko County in Subcarpathian Voivodeship (south-east Poland)
Łukawica, Lubaczów County in Subcarpathian Voivodeship (south-east Poland)
Łukawica, Świętokrzyskie Voivodeship (south-central Poland)